Shrewsbury School is a public school (English fee-charging boarding school for pupils aged 13 –18) in Shrewsbury.

Founded in 1552 by Edward VI by Royal Charter,  Shrewsbury School is one of the seven public schools subject to the Public Schools Act 1868 and one of the nine prestigious schools investigated by the Clarendon Commission between 1861 and 1864. It was originally a boarding school for boys, girls have been admitted into the Sixth Form since 2008 and the school has been co-educational since 2015. As of Michaelmas Term 2020, the school has 807 pupils: 544 boys and 263 girls. There are eight boys' boarding houses, four girls' boarding houses and two for approximately 130 day pupils.

The present site, to which the school moved in 1882, is on the south bank of the River Severn.

History

Foundation and early years 
Shrewsbury School was founded by charter granted by King Edward VI on 10 February 1552.

The foundation of the school followed a petition in 1542 to Henry VIII from the townspeople of Shrewsbury for a free grammar school, requesting that some portion of the estates of the town's two then recently dissolved Collegiate Churches of St Mary (established by King Edgar in the 10th century) and St Chad (established in the 1200s) in the town might be devoted to its support. These two collegiate churches would have had an educational role in the medieval town prior to their dissolution, and there is mention of a grammar school at Shrewsbury in a court case of 1439.

The school began operation in a house and land purchased from John Proude in 1551, together with three rented half-timbered buildings, which included Riggs Hall, built in 1450, these are now the only remaining part of the original buildings occupied by the institution.  Archaeological excavations of the sites of these first buildings in 1978 brought up finds going back to the Saxon period, along with relics of the school, now in the town collections.

The early curriculum was based on Continental Calvinism, under its foundational headmaster, Thomas Ashton (appointed 1561) and boys were taught the catechism of Calvin. The school attracted large numbers of pupils from Protestant families in Shrewsbury, Shropshire and North Wales, with 266 boys on its roll at the end of 1562. 

Early pupils lodged with local families.  for example, Sir Philip Sidney (who had a well-known correspondence with his father about his schooling) lodged with George Leigh (of the family of Sir Thomas Leigh), Member of Parliament for Shrewsbury. 

Sidney attended the school along with his lifelong friend Fulke Greville (later Lord Brooke), and Robert Devereux, 2nd Earl of Essex, who would marry his widow Frances Walsingham.  

The literary output of these school-day associations would become significant, with Francis Bacon joining, in 1579 their circle which naturally included also Mary Sidney, by then Countess of Pembroke, and Robert's Sister Penelope who inspired the "Stella" of Phillip Sidney's Astrophel and Stellla sonnet sequence.  

Essex would be later executed for staging a rebellion, where part of the provocation was staging of Shakespeare's Richard II, in which the playwright is thought to have performed.

Having achieved a reputation for excellence under Ashton, in 1571 the school was augmented by Queen Elizabeth I. By 1581, the school had 360 pupils and was described by William Camden in 1582 as "the best filled [school] in all England";  the population of the town grew by about 5% when the boarders returned during term time during this period.  In 1585 the schoolboys stood in battle array with bows and arrows by the castle gates when the Earl of Essex entered the town.

Although Ashton had resigned from his headmastership in 1568, he returned to Shrewsbury in 1578 to help draw up the ordinances governing the school, which were in force until 1798; under them, the borough bailiffs (mayors after 1638) had the power to appoint masters, with Ashton's old St John's College, Cambridge having an academic veto. Shrewsbury has retained links with the college, with the continued appointment of Johnian academics to the Governing Body, and the historic awarding of 'closed' Shrewsbury Exhibitions.

Scholars from the school were from time to time employed by the local community to draw and witness bonds for illiterate tradesmen in this period; for instance Richard Langley (whose father, a prosperous tailor, had purchased the Shrewsbury Abbey site after the dissolution), could remember being asked by a cooper in 1556 to witness a bond "at what time he was a scholar in the free school of Shrewsbury" aged about fifteen.

1600s 
In 1608 the town and the school were in fierce dispute about who should be appointed second master.  The headmaster, John Meighen, wished to promote the third master, Ralph Gittins; the town wished to appoint Simon Moston on the recommendation of St John's College, whose fellows had a say in the appointment of new masters.  When the town's bailiffs came to install their preferred candidate on 31 August 1608, the building had already been occupied by about 60 women from the town (including three spinsters, two widows, the wives of mercers, tailors, weavers, butchers, shoemakers, tanners, glovers, carpenters and coopers) taking the headmaster's side and preferring Gittins on the basis that only the son of a burgess could serve as second master. Jamming the school benches against the doors they barricaded themselves in the school until the following Saturday, passing a "great hammer" between themselves which had been used to gain entry to the school.  The authorities sought to read the Statute on Rebellion, but the women made such a noise nobody could hear it.  The incident provoked a mass of litigation in the courts of Chancery and Star Chamber in Westminster.

A house was also built for the school in 1617 in the nearby village of Grinshill as a retreat in times of plague.The stone buildings on Castle Gates, including a chapel, dormitories, library and classrooms were completed by 1630, with the Ashton's successor, John Meighen, founding a chained library in 1606, though the library had begun making acquisitions by 1596, with a terrestrial globe by the first English globe maker Emery Molineux being its first acquisition.  The book cases (with the books chained to them) in the library projected from the walls between the windows on both sides of the room forming alcoves for study: an arrangement that may still be see in the Duke Humphrey's Library—the completion of this room was celebrated by the masters and Bailiffs on 1 October 1612 by taking cake and wine in the new space.

Civil War 
Shrewsbury was occupied on behalf of the King during the Civil War. A council of war was appointed for the whole district, of which Lord Capel was president. This council held its meetings in the school library, and some of the school's books were damaged during this time.

A contentious "Royal Loan" was made to Charles I around September 1642 of £600 (around 75% of the money in the school exchequer at the time); a further £47 was lent to the corporation of the town. The loan was acknowledged under seal by the king in the following terms: Charles Rex

Trusty and well beloved we greet you well. Whereas ye have, out of your good affection to our present service and towards the supply of our extraordinary occasions, lent unto us the sum of £600, being a stock belonging to your school founded by our royal predecessor King Edward the Sixth, in this our Town of Shrewsbury. We do hereby promise that we shall cause the same to be truly repaid unto you whensoever ye shall demand the same, and shall always remember the loan of it as a very acceptable service unto us. Given under our Signet at our Court at Shrewsbury this nth of October, 1642.

To our trusty and well beloved Richard Gibbons, late Mayor of our Town of Shrewsbury, and Thomas Chaloner, Schoolmaster of our Free School there.This was considered a misappropriation of the school's funds. This was litigated in the Court of Chancery and before the Lords Commissioners of the Great Seal by the corporation of the town after the end of the civil war. The record of the royal loan in the school register at the time of the November audit of 1642, was torn out by the time this was before the courts. The taken funds were never recovered.

During the Commonwealth period following the execution of Charles I, Richard Baxter suggested the establishment of a university to serve Wales at Shrewsbury, utilising the school's premises, but due to lack of financial provision it came to nothing.

Restoration and 1700s 

The history of the school between 1664 and 1798 is not easily available, as the registers and papers between these periods have been lost for many years. Nevertheless diplomat Richard Hill, Baron Digby Governor of King's County in Ireland, Robert Price, Justice of the Court of Common Pleas, poet and politician Arthur Maynwaring, Thomas Bowers, Bishop of Chichester, attended the school at this time.

Celia Fiennes visited the school in 1698 and recorded the school as follows: "Here are three free schooles together, built of free stone, 3 Large roomes to teach the Children, wth severall masters. Ye first has 150£ a year ye second 100 ye third 50£ a year and teach Children from reading English till fit for ye University, and its free for Children not only of ye town but for all over England if they Exceed not ye numbers... ".

In the early eighteenth century, Daniel Defoe also visited the school, noting: "Here is a good Free-school, the most considerable in this Part of England ; founded by King Edward VI and endowed by Queen Elizabeth, with a very sufficient Maintenance for a Chief or Headmaster, and three Under-masters or Ushers. The Buildings, which are of Stone, are very spacious, particularly the Library, which has a great many Books in it. The School-masters have also very handsome Houses to dwell in; for that the Whole has the Face of a College.

A wing was added to the buildings on the original site during the Georgian period, connected to Rigg's Hall and spanning the old town wall.  Although this building was listed at grade two it was demolished around 100 years after the school had vacated the building when Shropshire County Council, who operated the buildings as a public library were engaged in major restorations works in the 1980s because the structure was by then unsound.

In 1798, a specific Act of Parliament, The Shrewsbury School Act, was passed for the better government of the school. This statutory scheme was latter amended by the Court of Chancery, in 1853.

1800s 
The school had just three headmasters during the 19th century.

Samuel Butler was appointed headmaster in 1798. Writing at this time he observed: "This school was once the Eton or the Westminster of Wales and all Shropshire", and under his leadership the school's reputation, which had receded from the Civil War, again grew. In 1839 an incident known as the "Boiled Beef Row" took place, where the boys walked out of the school in protest at the food, and the praepostors were all removed from office. In this period (1818–1825) Charles Darwin attended the school

.

Butler was succeeded by his pupil Benjamin Hall Kennedy (of Latin Primer fame) in 1836, who in turn gave way to Henry Whitehead Moss in 1866.

The school's original Castle Gates premises had little in way of provision for games. Under Dr Butler, there were two fives courts and playgrounds in front of and behind the buildings, but after the arrival of Dr Kennedy football was permitted, for which the school acquired a ground in Coton Hill (north of Castle Gates).

Under Butler and Kennedy, Shrewsbury was one of three provincial schools among the nine studied by the Clarendon Commission of 1861–64 (the schools considered being Eton, Charterhouse, Harrow, Rugby, Westminster, and Winchester, and two day schools: St Paul's and Merchant Taylors). Shrewsbury went on to be included in the Public Schools Act 1868, which ultimately related only to the boarding schools.

A legacy of this move can be seen in the school premises being referred to as "The Site".

The school continued in the 1600s buildings on its original site, until it was relocated in 1882. The school was relocated in the current Main School Building which dates from 1765 and had at different times housed a foundling hospital and the Shrewsbury workhouse, before translating to this current use. In order to meet this new purpose, it was remodelled by Sir Arthur Blomfield (whose other educational commissions include Marlborough College and Lady Margaret Hall, Oxford). At this time, the original premises were converted to a public Free Library and Museum by the Shrewsbury Borough Council, opening in their new role in 1885; over the course of the 20th century the library purpose gradually took over the whole building, to which major restoration was done in 1983.

Blomfield also designed School House, to the east of the Main School building which was constructed during the 1880s. The new Riggs Hall (which had existed from Tudor buildings at the old site) was also built at this time, as was Churchill's Hall and Moser's Hall: these buildings are the work of William White.A gothic chapel was built for the school (also by Blomfield) in 1887, though it has been noted that "Christian religion played only a very small part in the life of the Public Schools... [and] at Shrewsbury the Governors refused to allow Butler to address the school at a service" prior to this increased focus in the Victorian period. Its south and east windows in the chapel are by Kempe, employing medieval narrative style for lives of saints, scenes from the history of the school.

Other buildings have since grown up around the edge of the site, with sports pitches in the centre, with diverse buildings being added to the new site over the last 130 years.

1900s 

The main school building suffered a major fire in 1905. Moss was succeeded in 1908 by Cyril Alington, then Master in College at Eton. Alington, though a Fellow of All Souls College, Oxford, was a sportsman, evidenced by the 1914 appointment as his secretary of Neville Cardus, the future cricket journalist who had joined the school in 1912 as the school's assistant cricket professional.

At the time of his appointment as Headmaster, Alington was younger than any of the masters on the staff, so to bring in new blood into the teaching staff, he recruited several former Collegers from Eton, most notably The Rev. Ronald Knox. Alington wrote the school song and commissioned its flag (a banner of arms of its coat of arms), and he was an energetic builder; the school Alington Hall (assembly hall) is named after him. In December 1914 he wrote a poem, "To the School at War", which was published in The Times. After leaving Shrewsbury, Alington went on to serve as Chaplain to the King to King George V from 1921 until 1933, and then Dean of Durham, from 1933 to 1951. He appeared on the cover of Time magazine on 29 June 1931. "An accomplished classicist, a witty writer especially of light verse, and a priest of orthodox convictions ..."

During the Edwardian period Oldham's Hall was built (1911). The current library building was added in 1916.

Mountaineer Andrew Irvine, who, with George Mallory may have reached the summit of Mount Everest in the 1924 British Everest Expedition attended Shrewsbury during the First World War. During the 1920s the Georgian villa houses at Severn Hill and Ridgemount were acquired by the school and adapted into boarding houses. Severn Hill, the linear decedent of the house of which Irvine was captain, holds his ice axe from the expedition, discovered in 1933 by Wyn Harris.

First World War and afterwards 
The First World War saw 321 former members of the school die serving their country. A war memorial was added to the school in 1923 for these fallen. This memorial was added to after the Second World War to include the 135 members of the school who fell in that conflict. The monument includes a statue of Sir Phillip Sidney, the Elizabeth soldier, poet and courtier (who himself was an alumnus of the school and died of wounds sustained at the Battle of Zutphen in 1586), and faces the Main School building down an avenue of linden trees, known as 'central'.

Post Second World War 
Between 1944 and 1950 John Wolfenden (later Lord Wolfenden) was headmaster; he left Shrewsbury to become Vice-Chancellor of the University of Reading. He was appointed to various public body chairmanships by the Privy Council, and also went on to be director of the British Museum. His name is closely associated with the government-instituted Wolfenden Report, which he chaired.

In 1952, the school was 400 years old. It received a royal visit to mark the occasion, and presented the town with a new cross for the historic site of the town's High Cross (which had been removed in 1705) at the termination of the market street which was a starting point for civic and religious processions in the medieval town and a significant location (the place of execution of Earl of Worcester and others after the Battle of Shrewsbury in 1403, and of Dafydd III, last native Prince of Wales in 1283).

The future Deputy Prime Minister of the UK Michael Heseltine attended the school immediately after the Second World War on a scholarship. A number of the founders and writers of the satirical magazine Private Eye attended the school in the 1950s. Willy Rushton was also at the school at this time. The comedian, actor, writer and television presenter Michael Palin of Monty Python's Flying Circus attended the school shortly afterwards and a scholarship is now available named for him.

Between 1963 and 1975 Donald Wright served as headmaster. The Times has called Wright a "great reforming headmaster". While there, working with the Anglican Diocese of Liverpool, Wright took a leading role in the building of a new Shrewsbury House, the school's mission in Liverpool, which was opened in 1974 by Princess Anne. He secured many leading churchmen to come to preach in the school chapel, including Donald Coggan, Archbishop of Canterbury. After retiring as a headmaster in 1975, Wright became the Archbishop of Canterbury's Patronage Secretary, chaired the William Temple Foundation, and served as Secretary to the Crown Appointments Commission.

In the 1960s, Kingsland House, another 19th century gentleman's residence was acquired by the school and adapted for use for central catering for all pupils (previously food had been arranged in houses). A new science building was also added in the 1960s.

Sir Eric Anderson served as headmaster between 1975 and 1980. He went on to be Rector of Lincoln College, Oxford, chairman of the Heritage Lottery Fund and Provost of Eton, among other roles.

In 1988, another Georgian villa house, the Grove, was bought and adapted for use as boarding house. In 1996 a new IT building, the Craig Building, was added.

2000s 

Since the turn of the millennium, the school's site has seen investment, beginning with the addition of a statue of alumnus Charles Darwin being added to the site to mark the millennial, which was unveiled by Sir David Attenborough.

A new music school, The Maidment Building, was opened by HRH Prince Charles in 2001.

Girls were admitted to the school for the first time into the sixth-form in 2008, and the school became fully coeducational in 2015.

Two new boarding houses have been built, one named after Mary Sidney (completed 2006), and one after Emma Darwin (completed 2011).

Further additions to the site have been made: an indoor cricket centre (2006) and a new swimming pool (2007); the rowing facilities were extended with a new Yale Boat house, which was opened by Olympian Matt Langridge in 2012; A new Computing and Design faculty building, "the Chatri Design Centre" was established in 2017, re-purposing and redeveloping a former humanities building; and in 2015 a new building, Hodgeson Hall, was built to house the humanities departments.

The addition of a new theatre was announced in 2018.

Sports
The main sport in the Michaelmas (autumn) term is football, in the Lent term fives and rugby, and in summer cricket. Rowing takes place in all three terms. The kit of many of the sports teams shows a cross from the crown in the school's coat of arms, which is a practice that has been in place for at least 150 years. During much of the twentieth century, this cross was used solely by the school's boatclub.

Admission of girls in 2015 has seen the introduction of field hockey, netball and lacrosse, with cricket and tennis played during the summer term.

The present school buildings in Kingsland are arranged around the sports fields which have nine grass football pitches and one of Astroturf; almost all boys play football in the Michaelmas term.

Football 
Football, as a formal game, was incubated at the public schools of the nineteenth century and Shrewsbury had a key role in the game's development. Salopians were prominent in the early history of the organised game at Cambridge University, according to Adrian Harvey "Salopians formed a club of their own in the late 1830s/early 1840s but that was presumably absorbed by the Cambridge University Football Club that they were so influential in creating in 1846". The school has an 1856 copy of the Cambridge rules of football, predating the 1863 rules of the FA.

In these early years, each of the schools had their own versions of the game, and by the 1830s the version played at Shrewsbury had become known as "douling", taking this name from the Greek word for slave: the goal had no cross bar, favoured dribbling, and was being formally supported by the school's authorities to the extent it was compulsory. While, at the beginning of the 18th century, however, the school authorities deemed football "only fit for butchers boys", an attitude common at the other public schools, by the 1840s, all boarders were required to play Douling three times a week unless they were excused on medical grounds.

From 1853, the national press was publishing reports of football at the school, although at this time matches were predominantly between the various Houses. The school's first captain of football was appointed in 1854, and a school team was formed in the early 1860s for external mataches. Also by the 1860s football was sufficiently well-established for all Houses to field 1st and 2nd XI sides across all age groups.

The Arthur Dunn Challenge Cup (annual football cup competition played between the Old Boys of public schools started in 1903) was contested by Shrewsbury and Charterhouse in the first ever final, and shared by the two institutions following two draws, with two Morgan-Owen brothers choosing instead to turn out for Shrewsbury, instead of playing internationally in a Wales vs. Ireland game for which they had been selected. Shrewsbury has won the Arthur Dunn Challenge Cup a total of 11 times, including the Centenary Cup Final in 2003, a replay of the first final in 1903.  A club of Old Salopians attending the University of Cambridge, who had started playing association football in 1874, entered the FA Cup in 1875-76, but scratched when drawn away to Oxford University.

Shrewsbury has won the Independent Schools Football Association Boodles ISFA Cup twice: in 2000 and 2010.

Rowing 
Th Royal Shrewsbury School Boat Club (RSSBC) is one of the oldest school rowing clubs, having been founded in 1866.

Since the boat club began rowing at Henley Royal Regatta in 1912, they have won 14 times. Shrewsbury is only seconded in victories at Henley to Eton, having won specifically:

 Elsenham Cup: 1919
 Princess Elizabeth Challenge Cup: 1955, 1957, 1960, 1961, 2007
 Ladies’ Challenge Plate Winner: 1932
 Special Race for Schools/Fawley Challenge Cup: 1975,1976, 1980, 1981, 1982, 1984, 1985

Shrewsbury is one of only two public schools to have bumps races, the other being Eton, between the houses. They are rowed over four evenings at the end of term in July. There are usually three boats entered per house. On the fourth evening there are prizes for the leaders of the chart and the Leadbitter Cup for the boat which has made the most bumps over the four nights. The event is marshalled by senior rowers and rowing prefects, usually masters. The crew training is mainly pupil driven, though in preparation for Henley the school's First VIII rowers often do not take part, and therefore the boats are composed of other rowers and some non-rowers. Previously, races were run every day until there were no more bumps (i.e. until they were nominally in speed order). This historical set-up could lead to weeks of racing and it was therefore abandoned in favour of a four-day version more than 100 years ago. Otherwise, it is only Oxford and Cambridge that continue to have bumps. Shrewsbury and Eton both race bumps in fours whilst Oxford and Cambridge race in eights.

The town's rowing club, Pengwern Boat Club, has close historical links to the School's rowing activities, and for a time they jointly rented a boat house at the site of the current Pengwern club house.

A former captain of the boat club, John Lander, is the only Olympic gold medallist to have been killed in action in World War 2. GB Olympic silver medalist Rebecca Romero, and Paralympian Becca Chin both recently been appointed to coach within the club.

Running 
The Royal Shrewsbury School Hunt (RSSH or "the Hunt") is the oldest cross-country club in the world, with written records (the Hound Books) going back to 1831 and evidence that it was established by 1819. The sport of "the Hunt" or "the Hounds", now known as a Paper Chase, was formalised at the school around 1800. Two runners (the "foxes") made a trail with paper shreds and after a set time they would be pursued by the other runners (the "hounds"). The club officers are the Huntsman and Senior and Junior Whips. The hounds start most races paired into "couples" as in real fox hunting; the winner of a race is said to "kill". Certain of the races are started by the Huntsman, carrying a 200-year-old bugle and a ceremonial whip, dressed in scarlet shirt and a black velvet cap shouting:

All hounds who wish to run, run hard, run well, and may the devil take the hindmost

before lounging the bugle: and this has been done for nearly 200 years.

In his 1903 semi-autobiographical novel The Way of All Flesh, Old Salopian Samuel Butler describes a school based on Shrewsbury where the main protagonist's favourite recreation is running with "the Hounds" so "a run of six or seven miles across country was no more than he was used to". The first definite record of the Annual Steeplechase is in 1834, making it the oldest cross-country race of the modern era.

The main inter-house cross-country races are still called the Junior and Senior Paperchase, although no paper is dropped and urban development means the historical course can no longer be followed. Every October the whole school participates in a 3.5-mile run called "The Tucks", originally intended to prevent pupils attending a local horse race. It is now run at Attingham Park.

The school also lays claim to the oldest track and field meeting still in existence, which originated in the Second Spring Meeting first documented in 1840. This featured a series of mock horse races including the Derby Stakes, the Hurdle Race, the Trial Stakes and a programme of throwing and jumping events, with runners being entered by "owners" and named as though they were horses.

Cricket 

Cricket was being played at Shrewsbury at least as long ago as the 1860s. A reference was made to an effort to set up a game with Westminster School in 1866 (declined by Westminster) in a House of Commons debate by Jim Prior in 1961. Neville Cardus was the school's cricket professional in the early twentieth century.

Boys' 1st XI season focuses on the Silk Trophy, which competed for by Shrewsbury, Eton, Oundle and an overseas touring side at the end of each summer term.

The school competes in the HMC Twenty20 having made the finals day each year since 2010, winning the competition in 2011 and 2013. The school won the Lord's Taverners Trophy in 2005.

Old Salopians who have played county cricket include James Taylor, Scott Ellis, Nick Pocock, The Hon. Tim Lamb, Ian Hutchinson., Ed Barnard, Steve Leach, Ed Pollock, Dion Holden, Dave Lloyd, George Garret, George Panayi.

Eton Fives 
Eton Fives is major sport within the school and it has 14 Fives courts. At the end of the Lent Term the school competes in the Marsh Insurance National Schools Eton Fives Championships, which are held in rotation at Shrewsbury. Highgate and Eton.

A world record was set for the longest ever game of fives (at 39 hours of playing) was set in 1989 at the school, this was eclipsed by Uppingham School in 2019.

Minor sports 
Minor sports include: shooting, fencing, basketball, golf, equestrian, badminton, swimming, hockey and squash.

Performing arts

Heritage

The "first flowerings of English drama". in the Tudor period 
Under Thomas Ashton drama flourished. He made it a rule that, boys in the senior form had, every school day, to "declaim and play one Act of Comedy" before breaking from school, and the school put on frequent public Whitsuntide and mystery plays concerned with moral romance, scripture, and history.  In 1565, for instance, Julian the Apostle and another unnamed performance of Ashton's were performed before a large audience, which "listened with admiration and devotion".  Queen Elizabeth I, on a journey to the West Midlands in 1565 intended to visit Shrewsbury to see one of these performances, but "her Majesty not having proper information mistook the time and when she came to Coventry, hearing it was over, returned to London".  The Quarry park in the town had long been a place for sort and cultural activity in the old town, and this was the site of many of these plays, and a bank there cut in the form of an amphitheatre was established near the rope walk.

These were, according to Thomas Warton, probably the first fruits of the English theater.

On several occasions the school put on pageants for the visiting Council in the Marches, as in 1581 when the Lord President, Sir Henry Sidney, leaving the town by barge, was greeted by several scholars on an island down stream of the castle dressed as green nymphs with willow branches tied to their heads reciting verses across the water: And will your honour needs depart, and must it needs be so.

Would God we could like fishes swim, that we might with thee go.The Lord President was brought close to tears.

Originating ballet and pantomime 
John Weaver, the father of English ballet, and the originator of pantomime, was the master at the school in the 1600s.  He was responsible for the codification of dance.

He documented courtly dances which were a feature of courtly ritual in the Tudor and Steward period, and were a sincere instrument of statecraft to the holders of public office in those times.  In 2023 the school hosted the inaugural "John Weaver Festival of Dance", which included competitive performance of the art, along with an exhibition, which displayed Weavers own papers and material from Soulton Hall relating to its historic dancing pavement.

Contemporary Offer

Orchestras, ensembles and choirs 
The school has the following orchestras ensembles and choirs:

 The Symphony Orchestra;
 The Wind Orchestra;
 Big Band;
 Concert Band;
 The Pepys Brass Quintet (one of two brass quintets run for the best senior brass players in the school);
 Brass Ensemble
 String Ensemble
 The Chamber Choir
 The Chapel Choir
 The Community Choir (includes local members who are not part of the school)
 Jazz Band
 String quartets
 Junior and Senior string ensembles
 Clarinet and sax groups
 Tuba and horn quartets

Musicals 
Every other year (and sometimes more often), Shrewsbury puts on its own homegrown school musical which is taken to the Edinburgh Festival Fringe. These have included:

 Rebecca the Drowned Bride
 What You Will
 Bubble
 Jekyll!

Performances 

High-profile musicians and performers also visit the school with such visitors including:

 Jacques Loussier
 The Swingles
 Cristina Ortiz
 Tenebrae Choir
 Joe Stilgoe
 Jason Rebello
 Jenny Agutter
 Voces8
 Peter Donohoe

Culture

Philomath and Polymath 
The original buildings, and the present school library both have carved stone figures on the buildings. They represent, on the left φιλομαθης Philomathes [he who loves learning] (a character first penned by King James I in philosophical dialogue known as Daemonologie) and on the right πολυμαθης Polymathes [he who has much learning]. The first figure has taken his hat off to settle to learning; the second figure is about to place his hat back on having attended to his studies.

The original carvings are from 1630 and are accompanied by a table which says:MDCXXX [1630]

ΔΙΔΑΣΚΑΛΕΙΟΝ

ΕΑΝ ΗΣ ΕΣΗThis is based on a quotation from Isocrates, "εαν ης φιλομαθης, εσει πολυμαθης", which means "If you are studious (loving learning), you will be(come) learned; Διδασκαλειον means 'school'".#

Houses 
The School, as of Michaelmas Term 2020, has 807 pupils: 544 boys and 263 girls. There are eight boys' boarding houses, four girls' boarding houses and two for day pupils, each with its own housemaster or housemistress, tutor team and matron. Each house also has its own colours.

A single house will hold around 60 pupils, although School House and each of the dayboy houses hold slightly more. Having about 90 pupils, School House used to be divided into Doctors (black and white) and Headroom (magenta and white) for most sporting purposes, whilst being one house in other respects, but this distinction was abolished in around 2000.

There are many inter-house competitions: in football, for instance, each house competes in four different leagues (two senior, two junior) and three knock-out competitions (two senior, one junior).

The houses and their colours are:

School song 
The school has its own song, "Carmen Salopiense", written in 1916 by Cyril Alington who was Headmaster at the time.

Terminology 
In common with other such institutions, certain idiosyncratic jargon/slang has developed at the school.

This includes: Topschools (homework), Tardy (late), Shweff (to flirt), Dix (call over),

Masque 
To celebrate the 400-year anniversary of the school's foundation, in 1952, a masque was written which set out the history, great figures, and values of the school.

Music was by John Ranald Stainer, OBE, FRCM, FRCO, Hon RAM, and the script was written by Paul Dehn OS (best known for the screenplays for Goldfinger, The Spy Who Came in from the Cold, the Planet of the Apes sequels and Murder on the Orient Express).

Grants and prizes 
The school awards a number of prizes, some of which have been running for many years, among these are:

The Sidney Gold Medal, established 1838, is the top award Shrewsbury offers. It originally came with a purse of 50 sovereigns and was awarded to the top classicist going on to Oxbridge. The Trustees commissioned Sir Edward Thomason to cut the original die, and the image was based on a miniature painted by George Perfect Harding and owned by Dr Kennedy, now in the School collection. The medal was discontinued in 1855 when the stocks were exhausted, but was revived again in 1899. In 1980 the Salopian Club decided that the Medal should be open to all disciplines and not purely the Classics. Since that time the majority of recipients have excelled in the sciences.
The Arand Haggar Prize, established 1890, original known as "The Mathematics Prize", an almost unbroken run of the annual competition paper stretches back to 1890, making it one of the longest continually-run mathematics competitions in the country.
The Bentley Elocution Prize, established 1867: candidates are required recite well a poem of at least sonnet length, introduced by Thomas Bentley, whose career at the School spanned more than 50 years. Past winners include Sir Michael Palin.
Richard Hillary Essay Prize, established 2013, based on the single-word essay formula used for admission at All Souls College, Oxford.
The Miles Clark Travel Award, established 1994, recipients of this award have, for instance, cycled around the world for over four years, cycled back to the UK from Siberia, and cycled by tandem from the north coast of Canada to Tierra del Fuego – a number of accounts of these travels have been published.

Coat of arms and flag 
The Arms of the school are those of King Edward VI being The Arms of England (three lions passant) quartered with those of France (fleur-de-lys).

As a banner of arms, this is also used as the school's flag.

Royal visits 
The following royal visits have been made to Shrewsbury School:

The Duchess of Kent and Princess Victoria visited the school on 1 November 1832; they were guests of Lord Liverpool at Pitchford Hall for the visit.
Princess Louise, visited the school for coffee on 19 January 1898.
HRH the Duke of Teck (later Marquess of Cambridge) on 11 May 1911
George V visited the town of Shrewsbury in 1914, and laid a foundation at the school for a new library by electrical switch from the town's square.
 The future Edward VIII, then Prince of Wales, visited in 1932 to celebrate the Jubilee of the school's move to the Kingsland site.
Queen Elizabeth II and Prince Philip, Duke of Edinburgh visited the school to celebrate its 400-year anniversary of foundation in 1952.
The Princess Royal opened the new Shrewsbury School Club, called the Shewsy, in Everton in 1974.
Princess Margaret, in 1984, while officially visiting a new library in the town, lunched at the school and had a look at the new Art school.
The Queen Mother came to Kingsland Hall during the headmastership of Donald Wright in the 1990s.
The Prince of Wales opened the new music school in 2001.

Praepostors 

The schools' prefects are known as præpostors. The word originally referred to a monastic prior and is late Latin of the Middle Ages, derived from classical Latin praepositus, "placed before".The use of praepostor in the context of a school is derived from the practice of using older boys to lead or control the younger boys. Privileges associated with the office are a particular tie showing the school's arms and the right to cycle a bike to lessons.  Defining the role in 1821, Dr Butler wrote:"A præpostor is one of the first eight boys to whom the master delegates a certain share of authority, in whom he reposes confidence, and whose business it is to keep the boys in order, to prevent all kinds of mischief and impropriety..."

Awards 
House and school ties and scarfs are awarded achievements in co-curricular activities.

Scholarships, exhibitions and bursary support 
The school currently awards around £2.8M in fee remissions. Various measures of financial assistance are available to students associated with need and with ability, as set out below:

Academic scholarships 
 Four Butler Scholarships (up to 30% of fees)
 Six Kennedy and Moss Scholarships (up to 20% of fees)
 Seven Alington Scholarships (at least £2,000 per year)

Art scholarships 
Art scholarships are awarded annually, most of which carry a fee remission of 10%, and larger awards are sometimes made.

Music scholarships 
Music scholarships are awarded each year, worth up to 30% of the fees and the scholars receive free music tuition on two instruments.

All-Rounder Scholarships 
A small number of Sir Michael Palin All-Rounder Scholarships are awarded each year.

Other scholarships and bursaries 
Scholarship awards are also made for drama, sport, and design and technology, and sixth-form scholarships are also available. Bursary support grants are also available.

Ancient library 

The school has an ancient library, containing various significant antiquarian books and other items.

Particular highlights of the collection include:

 Charles Darwin's school atlas, along with books, manuscripts and letters
 Newton's Principia, acquired on publication in 1687
 Some forty medieval manuscripts, including a fine twelfth-century Gradual from Haughmond Abbey near Shrewsbury, and the Lichfield Processional with its unique liturgical English plays of circa 1430 and polyphonic music
 A death mask of Oliver Cromwell
 A first edition of the King James Bible 
 1534 Tyndale Bible

Art collection 
The Moser Gallery, within the library buildings, contains part of the school's collection of paintings.

This includes work by J. M. W Turner, important nineteenth-century watercolours, and work by alumnus Kyffin Williams.

Co-curricular and Extension

Visiting speakers 
Past guest speakers hosted at the school include:

Sir Arthur Conan Doyle
AC Grayling
Hilaire Belloc
Donald Coggan when Archbishop of Canterbury
Lord Hague,
Lord Heseltine,
Lord Hennessy,
Lord Hutton,
Lord Hurd,
Oleg Gordievsky
Omar Beckles,
Sir Colin McColl,
Aidan Hartley.
Will Gompertz

Societies 
There are dozens of organisations known as 'societies', in many of which pupils come together to discuss a particular topic or to

listen to a lecture, presided over by a senior pupil, and often including a guest speaker, they are largely run by the students.

Those in existence at present include:

 Archery
 Art & Photography
 Bastille Society (history)
 Beekeeping
 Canoe and Kayak Club
 Chinese
 Christian Forum
 Coding
 Comedy
 Cooking
 Craft and Textiles Club
 Creative Writing Society
 Darwin Society (Science)
 Debating Society
 Drama
 French
 Heseltine Society
 Junior History Society
 Maths Club
 Mindfulness
 Model Railway Society
 Model United Nations
 Paired Reading Society (students visit a local primary school, where they work with younger children on a one-to-one basis in order to help develop their reading skills).
 Pilates
 Quizzing
 Reading
 Royal Shrewsbury School Shooting Club
 Sidney Society (literature)
 Spanish Society
 STEM
 Technical Theatre

There is also a Combined Cadet Force.

Headmasters

Notable masters
Nick Bevan, housemaster, rowing coach, later headmaster of Shiplake College
Anthony Chenevix-Trench, housemaster of School House, later headmaster of Bradfield College, Eton College and Fettes College
Sir William Gladstone, 7th Baronet, teacher and officer
Michael Hoban, assistant master, classics teacher, later headmaster of Bradfield College, St Edmund's School, Canterbury and Harrow School
The Reverend Monsignor Ronald Knox, English Catholic priest, theologian, author and broadcaster
Frank McEachran
David Profumo, 6th Baron Profumo, teacher and novelist

Affiliate schools 

Shrewsbury has the following affiliate schools:

 Shrewsbury International School, Bangkok. Riverside located on the banks of the Chao Phraya River, opened 2003 with 1,736 students
Shrewsbury International School, Bangkok. City Campus, established in 2018, a feeder school for Riverside campus
 Shrewsbury International School, Hong Kong, opened 2018;
 Packwood Haugh School, is a Shropshire Preparatory School which united with Shrewsbury School in 2019.

Shrewsbury is also set to open three new international schools in China by 2022, including its first overseas boarding school.

Fees and admission 
Pupils are admitted at the age of 13 by selective examination, and for approximately ten per cent of the pupils, English is a second or additional language. The fees at Shrewsbury are up to £12,980 a term for UK students and up to £13,500 a term for international students, with three terms per academic year in 2019.

Old Salopians

Former pupils are referred to as Old Salopians (from the old name for Shropshire).

Contemporary Old Salopians 

1930s

 Sir William Adams  (born 1932), ambassador to Tunisia 198487 and Egypt 198792
 Peter Brown  (born 1935), historian of Late Antiquity and Fellow of All Souls College, Oxford
 Christopher Booker (born 1937), journalist, founder of Private Eye
 Paul Foot (1937–2004), journalist
 Michael Heseltine, Baron Heseltine  (born 1933), politician and Deputy Prime Minister
 Brian Hutton, Baron Hutton  (born 1931), Law Lord, Lord Chief Justice of Northern Ireland and Chairman of Hutton Inquiry
 Christopher Gill  (born 1936), politician
 Richard Ingrams (born 1937), journalist, founder of Private Eye
 Sir Colin Hugh Verel McColl  (born 1932), head of the Secret Intelligence Service (MI6)
 Air Marshal Sir Michael Simmons  (born 1937), Royal Air Force Officer, Assistant Chief of the Air Staff

1940s

 Richard Barber  (born 1941), historian
 Richard Best, Baron Best  (born 1945), politician
 Piers Brendon (born 1940), writer
 Major General Sir Robert John Swan Corbett  (born 1940), Commandant of the British Sector in Berlin 1987-90
 Athel Cornish-Bowden (born 1943), biochemist
 Sir Peter Davis (born 1941), businessman and chairman of Sainsbury's
 Edward Foljambe, 5th Earl of Liverpool (born 1944), Conservative politician and peer
 Martin Ferguson Smith  (born 1941), scholar, writer and Classics and Ancient History professor at Durham
 Robin Hodgson, Baron Hodgson of Astley Abbotts  (born 1942), politician and life peer
 Stephen Jessel (born 1942), BBC correspondent
 David Lovell Burbidge  (born 1943), High Sheriff of the West Midlands County 1990–91
 David Lamb, 3rd Baron Rochester (born 1944), A nobleman.
 Christopher MacLehose (born 1940), publisher
 Terry Milewski (born 1949), journalist
 Nick Owen (born 1947), TV presenter
 Sir Mark Moody-Stuart  (born 1940), ex-chairman of Royal Dutch Shell and Chairman of the UN Global Compact committee
 Sir Michael Palin  (born 1943), actor and TV presenter
 Richard Passingham  (born 1943), neurologist
 Sir Nicholas Penny  (born 1949), art historian, Director of the National Gallery
Martin Rees, Baron Rees of Ludlow  (born 1942), Astronomer Royal, erstwhile Master of Trinity College, Cambridge, ex-President of Royal Society
Clyde Sanger (born 1928), journalist and author, first Africa correspondent for The Guardian
 Sir John Stuttard  (born 1945), Alderman and Lord Mayor of the City of London 2006–07
 Sir Francis John Badcock Sykes, 10th Baronet (born 1942), businessman
 Thomas Townley Macan (born 1946), Governor and Commander-in-Chief of the British Virgin Islands
 Sir Roderic Victor Llewellyn, 5th Baronet (born 1947), author
 Selby Whittingham (born 1941), art expert
 Sir James William Vernon, 5th Baronet (born 1949), landowner and accountant
 Lieutenant General Sir Christopher Wallace  (1943–2016), Commandant Royal College of Defence Studies
 Sir Stephen Wright  (born 1946), diplomat, Under-Secretary at the Foreign and Commonwealth Office, Ambassador to Spain

1950s

 Bruce Clark (born 1958), author and International Security Editor of The Times
 Stephen Glover (born 1952), journalist & columnist
 Timothy Edward Lamb (born 1959), cricketer and sports administrator
 Sir John Auld Mactaggart, 4th Baronet (born 1951), entrepreneur and philanthropist
 Jonathan Peter Marland, Baron Marland (born 1956), Treasurer of the Conservative Party
 Sir Andrew McFarlane (born 1954), Lord Justice of Appeal in England and Wales
 Sir Philip Montgomery Campbell   (born 1951), astrophysicist and editor-in-chief of Nature
 Michael Proctor  (born 1950), academic and Provost of King's College, Cambridge
 Nicholas Rankin (born 1950), writer and broadcaster
 Johnathan Ryle (born 1952), writer, anthropologist and professor at Bard College
 Desmond Shawe-Taylor  (born 1955), art historian, Surveyor of the Queen's Pictures
 Jonathon Shawe-Taylor (born 1953), Director of the Centre for Computational Statistics and Machine Learning at University College, London
Christopher Beazley (born 1952), Member of the European Parliament 1984-2009

1960s

 Andrew Berry (born 1963), biologist and lecturer of Organismic and Evolutionary Biology at Harvard
 Simon Baynes (born 1960), politician 
 Tim Booth (born 1960), musician
 Charles A. Foster (born 1962), writer, veterinarian, barrister and Fellow of Green Templeton College, Oxford 
 Nick Hancock (born 1962), actor and TV presenter
 Vice Admiral Sir Clive Johnstone  (born 1961), Royal Navy officer and former Commander of the Allied Maritime Command
 John Humphrey Arnott Pakington, 7th Baron Hampton (born 1964), landowner and photographer
 Jonathan Legard (born 1961), journalist and broadcaster
 Jonathan Lord (born 1962), politician
 Twm Morys (born 1961), poet and musician.
 Mark Oakley (born 1968), Canon Chancellor of St. Paul's Cathedral and Dean of St John's College, Cambridge
 Angus Pollock (born 1962), cricketer for Cambridge University Cricket Club
 Simon Shackleton (born 1968), DJ, musician
 James St Clair Wade (born 1962), architect
 Martin Wainwright  (born 1960), journalist and author

1970s

 Charles Robertson-Adams (born 1976), athlete
 Christopher Hope  (born 1972), journalist, political editor of The Daily Telegraph
 Alastair Humphreys (born 1976), adventurer and author
1980s

 Omar ‘Ali Bolkiah (born 1986), Crown Prince of the Sultanate of Brunei
 Anthony Mangnall (born 1989), MP for Totnes
 Alexander Orlando Bridgeman, Viscount Newport (born 1980), businessman and landowner
 Freddie Fisher (born 1985), actor 
 Richard Goulding (born 1980) actor
 Ian Massey (born 1985), cricketer, Cambridge MCCU and Herefordshire
 Joshua Sasse (born 1987), actor
Will Tudor (born 1987), actor

1990s

James Taylor (born 1990), Leicestershire, Nottinghamshire and England cricketer
Claas Mertens (born 1992), German rower

Victoria Cross holders

Two Old Salopians received the Victoria Cross, both in the First World War, 1914–18.
Thomas Tannatt Pryce 
Harold Ackroyd

Old Salopain activities 
The "Old Salopian Club", now known as the Salopian Club, was founded in 1886. A number of reunions, clubs and activities are arranged by the club. The post nominals OS are used to denote Old Salopians.

Sports 
Former members of the school have various sporting clubs:

 Rowing is arranged by the "Sabrina Club", which fields crews, including for Henley Royal Regatta as well as supporting the school crews at various events
 Cricket is arranged by the "Saracens"
 Old Salopian golf, yachting, fives cross country, tennis, football, squash and basketball are also provided for.

Careers, arts and activities 
Arrangements for cultural engagement of former members if the school, for instance concerts and plays and art exhibitions are also put on, and there is a programme around careers.

Social action

Shrewsbury House 
A mission in Everton, Liverpool, called "Shrewsbury House" was established in 1903. It is less formally known as "the Shrewsy" and is a youth and community center associated with St Peter's Church Everton. Lord Heseltine was first introduced to social issues in Liverpool which the took up in the 1980s at this mission.

Medic Malawi 
The charity Medic Malawi, which includes a hospital, two orphanages and The Shrewsbury School Eye Clinic has an ongoing relationships and support from the school community.

Other activities 
During the coronavirus pandemic of 2020 the school donated over 1,600 items of personal protective equipment to the NHS, including face shields it had 3D printed in its technology labs. It also opened up rooms in its boarding houses for use for NHS staff.

Steam locomotive 
One of the Southern Rail, class V, Schools Class 4-4-0 locomotives designed by Maunsell and built at Eastleigh and was named "Shrewsbury". Its SR number was 921 and its BR number was 30921. It entered service in 1934 and it was withdrawn in 1962 and from use on railways and the name plaque preserved in the Admissions Offices/Registry of the school.

Farm house 
The school maintains a farmhouse at Talargerwyn in Snowdonia. This is used for outward-bound type activities and research trips.

Foundation 
In 1965 the school established "The Foundation", which is one of the oldest school development offices in the country.

Controversy 
In September 2005, the school was one of fifty independent schools operating independent school fee-fixing, in breach of the Competition Act, 1998. All of the schools involved were ordered to abandon this practice, pay a nominal penalty of £10,000 each and to make ex-gratia payments totalling three million pounds into a trust designed to benefit pupils who attended the schools during the period in respect of which fee information had been shared.

See also
Listed buildings in Shrewsbury (outer areas)

References

Citations

General sources 
 Carr, A. M., and T. Fullman (1983). Shrewsbury Library: Its History and Restoration. Shropshire Libraries.
 Stewart, Alan (2000). Philip Sidney: A Double Life. Chatto and Windus. .

Further reading
 Blakeway, John Brickdale & Alfred Rimmer (1889). History of Shrewsbury School, 1551–1888.
 Bloomfield, R. (2005), History of Rowing at Shrewsbury School
 Charlesworth, M. L. (1994). Behind the Headlines. Somerset: Greenbank Press. .
 Draisey, M. (2014). Thirty Years On! A Private View of Public Schools. Halsgrove.  .
 Fanning, Peter (2015). The Divided Self: Senior Moments at Shrewsbury School 1981–2012 . Somerset: Greenbank Press. .
 Fisher, George William, and John Spencer Hill (1899). Annals of Shrewsbury School.
 Gee, D. (2015). City on a Hill: A Portrait of Shrewsbury School. Somerset: Greenbank Press. .
 McEachran, F. (1991), A Cauldron of Spells  Jan. 1992 Somerset: Greenbank Press. .
 Oldham, J. B. (1952). The History of Shrewsbury School.
 UK Parliament. Clarendon Report (London: HM Stationery Office 1864).

External links

 
 Text of the Public Schools Act 1868, Education in England

Boarding schools in Shropshire
Private schools in Shropshire
Member schools of the Headmasters' and Headmistresses' Conference
Educational institutions established in the 1550s
1552 establishments in England
Schools in Shrewsbury
Schools with a royal charter